Christmas Party is the second Christmas album and the sixth studio album by the folk/indie rock band She & Him, consisting of actress and musician Zooey Deschanel and musician M. Ward. The album was released on October 28, 2016, and features several covers of classic holiday songs.

At Metacritic, which assigns a normalized rating out of 100 to reviews from mainstream critics, the album received a score of 68, based on 16 critics, indicating "generally favorable" reviews.

Track listing

Charts

References

She & Him albums
2016 Christmas albums
Columbia Records Christmas albums
Christmas albums by American artists
Covers albums
Pop Christmas albums